Gomphurus modestus, the Gulf Coast clubtail, is a species of dragonfly in the family Gomphidae. It is endemic to the southeastern United States, and is found in medium to large, slow-flowing rivers over rock, mud and sand substrates.

This species was formerly a member of the genus Gomphus. It is now considered to be a member of the genus Gomphurus, after Gomphurus was elevated in rank from subgenus to genus in 2017.

The IUCN conservation status of Gomphurus modestus is "LC", least concern, with no immediate threat to the species' survival. The population is stable. The IUCN status was reviewed in 2018.

References

Insects of the United States
Gomphidae
Taxonomy articles created by Polbot
Insects described in 1942